Josh Blackie (born 3 August 1979) is a former New Zealand rugby union player who notably played for Otago in the National Provincial Championship and the Highlanders in Super Rugby. He also had a long stint for the Kobelco Steelers in Japan and played a season with the Blues in 2008. His position of choice was flanker.

He has played over a dozen tournaments as part of the New Zealand Rugby Sevens team. He won a gold medal at the 2006 Melbourne Commonwealth Games.

On 23 April 2007, it was announced that Blackie would leave the Otago Rugby Football Union and the Highlanders to take up a contract to play rugby in Japan for the Kobelco Steelers.

On 10 October 2008, it was stated that Blackie signed a 2-year deal with the Auckland Rugby Union, making him eligible for the Blues and the All Blacks. Blackie cited the reason for moving to Auckland instead of Otago was he was born and raised in Auckland.

In 2013 Blackie established a scholarship of academic and sports fees for a year 10 student at his old school Liston College.

References

External links
 Highlanders profile Retrieved 13 March 2007

Highlanders (rugby union) players
Blues (Super Rugby) players
1979 births
Commonwealth Games gold medallists for New Zealand
Expatriate rugby union players in Japan
Kobelco Kobe Steelers players
Living people
New Zealand rugby union players
Otago rugby union players
People educated at Liston College
Rugby union players from Auckland
Rugby sevens players at the 2006 Commonwealth Games
New Zealand male rugby sevens players
Rugby union flankers
New Zealand expatriate rugby union players
New Zealand expatriate sportspeople in Japan
New Zealand international rugby sevens players
Commonwealth Games rugby sevens players of New Zealand
Commonwealth Games medallists in rugby sevens
Medallists at the 2006 Commonwealth Games